Pandemis chondrillana is a species of moth of the  family Tortricidae. It is found in France, Bulgaria, Romania, Ukraine, Russia, Asia Minor, Iran, Afghanistan, from Kazakhstan to Siberia, Kyrgyzstan, Mongolia and north-western China.

The wingspan is 17–24 mm for males and 20–27 mm for females. Adults have been recorded on wing from May to July.

The larvae feed on Rosa, Salix, Populus and Quercus species.

References

Moths described in 1860
Pandemis